The following buildings were added to the National Register of Historic Places as part of the Venice MPS Multiple Property Submission (or MPS).

Notes

 Venice
National Register of Historic Places Multiple Property Submissions in Florida